is an area within Shibuya, Tokyo, Japan.

Origins
It is said the origin of the name Hatagaya, comes from the year 1082, when Minamoto no Yoshiie was returning to his home and stopped in the area and washed a white flag, put it up on a pole and hosted a banquet.  (Hatagaya translates to "flag valley.")

Transportation
Hatagaya is served by Hatagaya Station on the Keio New Line. It is also served by bus, linking Shinjuku, Nakano, Shibuya, Asagaya and Yoyogi.

Economy
Companies including Olympus and Terumo have offices here. The main shopping district in Hatagaya is Rokugo Dori (六号通り), a street along which there are many shops, restaurants and bars.

Demography

Places of interest

Cultural

Temples
 Seiganji (清岸寺) (Hatagaya 2-36-1)

Schools

 operates public elementary and junior high schools.

Hatagaya 2-chome 35, 38, 43, 45, 49, and 5-56 ban, and Hatagaya 3-chome 1-36 and 38-81 ban are zoned to Nakahata Elementary School (中幡小学校). Hatagaya 1-chome 1-9 and 13-34-ban and 2-chome 1-19, 39-42, 44, 46-48, and 50-ban are zoned to Nishihara Elementary School (西原小学校). Hatagaya 1-chome 10-12 ban, 2-chome 20-34, 36, and 37-ban, and 3-chome 37-ban are zoned to Sasazuka Elementary School (笹塚小学校).

Hatagaya 3-chome, 1-chome 10-12 ban, and 2-chome 20-38, 43, 45, 49, and 51-56 ban are zoned to Sasazuka Junior High School (笹塚中学校). Hatagaya 1-chome 1-9 and 13-34-ban and 2-chome 1-19, 39-42, 44, 46-48, and 50-ban are zoned to Yoyogi Junior High School (代々木中学校).

Schools within Hatagaya:
 Nakahata Elementary School (渋谷区立中幡小学校) (Hatagaya 3-49-1)

Other
 Tokyo Fire Department Fire Technology and Safety Laboratory (東京消防庁消防科学研究所) (Hatagaya 1-13-20)

References

Shibuya